The Federación Unitaria de Trabajadores de Honduras (FUTH) is a national trade union center in Honduras. It is affiliated with the World Federation of Trade Unions. Unions affiliated with FUTH include the Union of Beverage and Related Industry Workers (STIBYS).

José Ovidio Suazo Díaz, President of FUTH, 2022-2023

Trade unions in Honduras
World Federation of Trade Unions